The Mastermind Jinda Sukha is 2015 Punjabi film initially released 11 September 2015. Film is based on facts and letters exchanged by Harjinder Singh Jinda and Sukhdev Singh Sukha during their imprisonment in Pune.

Cast
Cast of The Mastermind Jinda Sukha is:
 Nav Bajwa
 Sonpreet Jawanda
 Guggu Gill
 Sukhjinder Shera 
 Satwant Kaur
 Harinder Bubb 
 Isha Sharma 
 Sunita Dhir 
 Davvy Singh 
 Amritpal Singh (Billa) 
 Jaggi Dhuri
 Parminder Gill

Shooting
The Mastermind Jinda Sukha is shot at Harjinder Singh Jinda's and Sukhdev Singh Sukha's villages. Its also shot at different locations of Pune city. But shooting at Gen Vaidya Marg (Old Anderson Road) was not allowed as its location falls in cantonment area for which film crew was not granted permission by Indian Army officials.

Release
The Mastermind Jinda Sukha was to release on 11 September worldwide and was cleared by censor board on 24 July. Film was released Overseas market on 11 September 2015.

Ban
The Mastermind Jinda Sukha was banned by CBFC on 9 September after Home Ministry was alerted by Intelligence Bureau. 
Shubhra Gupta, The Indian Express’s film critic and former member of the CBFC criticised the ban and questioned censorship vs certification in India. Other CBFC member and filmmaker Ashoke Pandit, also criticised CBFC chairman Pahlaj Nihalani’s decision to Ban the movie.

References

2015 films
Punjabi-language Indian films
2010s Punjabi-language films